Gilbane, Inc. (Gilbane) is a national construction and real estate development company based in Providence, Rhode Island. It is the parent organization of Gilbane Building Company and Gilbane Development Company. Gilbane, Inc. is a sixth-generation, family-owned business.

History 
Formerly known as William Gilbane and Brother, the company was founded in 1870 by William H. Gilbane and his brother, Thomas, as a carpentry and general contracting shop in Providence, Rhode Island. Gilbane, Inc. remains headquartered in Providence. In 2017, Gilbane, Inc. completed a $10-million renovation of its headquarters.

Operations 
Notable projects from Gilbane Inc.'s subsidiary, Gilbane Building Company, include the 1964 New York World's Fair, the 1980 Winter Olympics facilities in Lake Placid, New York, the Vietnam Veterans Memorial and the National Air and Space Museum in Washington D.C., and the Fenway Park clubhouse improvements in Boston.

Notable projects of Gilbane’s other subsidiary, Gilbane Development Company, include facilities in Campustown for Iowa State University students and the first “purpose-built” student housing, 257 Thayer, in Providence, Rhode Island.

References 

Companies based in Providence, Rhode Island
Real estate companies of the United States
Privately held companies of the United States
Construction and civil engineering companies of the United States
Real estate companies established in 1873
Companies established in 1873
1873 establishments in Rhode Island
1873 establishments in the United States
Family-owned companies of the United States